Maharashtra Sugarcane Cutting and Transport Workers Union, a trade union at the sugarfields of Maharashtra, India. MSCTWU is affiliated to the Centre of Indian Trade Unions. The president of the union is Dr. D.L. Karad.

Trade unions in India
Centre of Indian Trade Unions
Indian agriculture and forestry trade unions